The 2016–17 Sydney FC season was the club's ninth season in the W-League, the premier competition for women's football in Australia. The team played home games at Lambert Park and Allianz Stadium. 

They were eliminated in the semi-finals by Perth Glory of a 5–1 loss at nib Stadium.

Players

Squad information

Transfers in

Transfers out

Contract extensions

Managerial staff

Squad statistics

Competitions

W-League

League table

Results summary

Results by round

Matches
For season fixtures, see sydneyfc.com.

References

External links
 Official Website

Sydney FC (A-League Women) seasons
Sydney FC